The Grange, officially named The National Grange of the Order of Patrons of Husbandry, is a social organization in the United States that encourages families to band together to promote the economic and political well-being of the community and agriculture. The Grange, founded after the Civil War in 1867, is the oldest American agricultural advocacy group with a national scope. The Grange actively lobbied state legislatures and Congress for political goals, such as the Granger Laws to lower rates charged by railroads, and rural free mail delivery by the Post Office.

In 2005, the Grange had a membership of 160,000, with organizations in 2,100 communities in 36 states. It is headquartered in Washington, D.C., in a building built by the organization in 1960. Many rural communities in the United States still have a Grange Hall and local Granges still serve as a center of rural life for many farming communities.

History
The commissioner of the Department of Agriculture commissioned Oliver Kelley, after a personal interview with President Andrew Johnson, to go to the Southern states and to collect data to improve Southern agricultural conditions.  In the South, poor farmers bore the brunt of the Civil War and were suspicious of Northerners like Kelley. Kelley found he was able to overcome these sectional differences as a Mason.  With Southern Masons as guides, he toured the war-torn countryside in the South and was appalled by the outdated farming practices. In the western states, Kelley deplored the lack of "progressive agriculture", with illiterate "ignorant" farmers who were "using a system of farming [that] was the same as that handed down by generations gone by". He saw the need for an organization that would bring people together from across the country in a spirit of mutual cooperation; after many letters and consultations with the other founders, the Grange was born. The first Grange, Grange #1, was founded in 1868 in Fredonia, New York. Seven men and one woman co-founded the Grange: Oliver Hudson Kelley, William Saunders, Francis M. McDowell, John Trimble, Aaron B. Grosh, John R. Thompson, William M. Ireland, and Caroline Hall. In 1873 the organization was united under a National Grange in Washington, D.C.

Paid agents organized local Granges and membership in the Grange increased dramatically from 1873 (200,000) to 1875 (858,050).  Many of the state and local granges adopted non-partisan political resolutions, especially regarding the regulation of railroad transportation costs. The organization was unusual at this time, because women and any teen old enough to draw a plow (aged 14 to 16) were encouraged to participate. The importance of women was reinforced by requiring that four of the elected positions could be held only by women.

Rapid growth infused the national organization with money from dues, and many local granges established consumer cooperatives, initially supplied by the wholesaler Aaron Montgomery Ward. Poor fiscal management, combined with organizational difficulties resulting from rapid growth, led to a massive decline in membership. By the turn of the 20th century, the Grange rebounded and membership stabilized.

The Granger movement supported efforts by politicians to regulate rates charged by the railroads and grain warehouses.  It claimed credit for the ideas of the Cooperative Extension Service, Rural Free Delivery, and the Farm Credit System. The peak of their political reputation was marked by the Supreme Court decision in Munn v. Illinois (1877), which held that grain warehouses were a "private utility in the public interest," and so could be regulated by public law. However this achievement was overturned later by the Supreme Court in  Wabash v. Illinois (1886).  The Grange also endorsed the temperance cause to avoid alcohol, the direct election of Senators and women's suffrage.

Partisan politics 
While the Grange was not a political party, Grangers were involved in several political movements in the Midwestern United States in the late 19th century, such as the Reform Party of Wisconsin.

Decline in membership 
Grange membership has declined considerably as the percentage of American farmers has fallen from a third of the population in the early 20th century to less than two percent today. Between 1992 and 2007, the number of Grange members fell by 40%. Washington has the largest membership of any state, at approximately 13,000.

Today

 the Grange continues to press for the causes of farmers, including issues of free trade and farm policy. In its 2006 Journal of Proceedings, the organization's report on its annual convention, the organization lays out its mission and how it works towards achieving it through fellowship, service, and legislation:

The Grange provides opportunities for individuals and families to develop to their highest potential in order to build stronger communities and states, as well as a stronger nation.

In 2019, the National Grange revised their Mission Statement:

The Grange strengthens individuals, families and communities through grassroots action, service, education, advocacy and agriculture awareness.

As a non-partisan organization, the Grange supports only policies, never political parties or candidates. Although the Grange was founded to serve the interests of farmers, because of the shrinking farm population the Grange has begun to broaden its range to include a wide variety of issues, and anyone is welcome to join the Grange.

The Junior Grange is open to children 5–14. Regular Grange membership is open to anyone age 14 or older. The Grange Youth, a group within the Grange, consists of members 13 1/2 to 35.

In 2013, the Grange signed on to a letter to Congress calling for the doubling of legal immigration and legalization for undocumented immigrants currently in the United States. However, this position has been somewhat revised, and the Grange now emphasizes an expansion in the H-2A visa program to increase legal immigration and address the crisis-level labor shortage in agriculture. They support the enforcement of immigration law but urge discretion with regard to the impact on labor availability.

Rituals and ceremonies

When the Grange first began in 1867, it borrowed some of its rituals and symbols from Freemasonry, including oaths, secret meetings, and special passwords necessary to keep railroad spies out of their meetings.  It also copied ideas from Greek, Roman and Biblical mythology.  Small, ceremonial farm tools are often displayed at Grange meetings. Elected officers are in charge of opening and closing each meeting. There are seven degrees of Grange membership; the ceremony of each degree relates to the seasons and various symbols and principles.

During the last few decades, the Grange has moved toward public meetings and no longer meets in secret. Though the secret meetings do not occur, the Grange still acknowledges its rich history and practices some traditions.

Organization

The Grange is a hierarchical organization ranging from local communities to the National Grange organization. At the local level are community Granges, otherwise known as subordinate Granges. All members are affiliated with at least one subordinate. In most states, multiple subordinate Granges are grouped together to form Pomona Granges. Typically, Pomona Granges are made up of all the subordinates in a county. Next in the order come State Granges, which is where the Grange begins to be especially active in the political process. State Masters (Presidents) are responsible for supervising the administration of Subordinate and Pomona Granges. Together, thirty-five State Granges, as well as Potomac Grange #1 in Washington, D.C., form the National Grange. The National Grange represents the interests of most Grangers in lobbying activities similar to the state, but on a much larger scale. In addition, the National Grange oversees the Grange ritual. The Grange is a grassroots organization; virtually all policy originates at the subordinate level.

The motto of the Grange is In necessariis unitas, in dubiis libertas, in omnibus caritas ("In essentials, unity; in non-essentials, liberty; in all things, charity").  Indeed, the word "grange" comes from a Latin word for grain, and is related to a "granary" or, generically, a farm.

Notable people

D. Wyatt Aiken (1828–1887), South Carolina. Member of the United States House of Representatives.
Harold J. Arthur (1904–1971), Vermont. 68th Governor of Vermont
Nahum J. Bachelder (1854–1934), New Hampshire. 49th Governor of New Hampshire.
Charles J. Bell (1845–1909), Vermont. 50th Governor of Vermont.
Robert Bergland (1928–2018), Minnesota. 20th United States Secretary of Agriculture.
Charles F. Brannan (1903–1992), Colorado. 14th United States Secretary of Agriculture
Ezra S. Carr, California. 7th California State Superintendent of Public Instruction. Professor of Agriculture at the University of California, Berkeley.
Norman Jay Coleman (1827–1911), New York. 1st United States Secretary of Agriculture
Henry C. Groseclose, Virginia. Founder of the Future Farmers of Virginia and Future Farmers of America
Aaron B. Grosh (1803–1884), Founder of the National Grange. First Chaplain of the National Grange.
Caroline A. Hall (1838–1918), Founder of the National Grange. 
William M. Ireland (???–1891), Founder of the National Grange. First Treasurer of the National Grange.
Oliver Hudson Kelley (1826–1913), agriculturalist, organizer. Primary founder of the Order of Patrons of Husbandry. First Secretary of the National Grange.
Evander M. Law (1836–1920), Confederate general and organizer of the Alabama Grange.
David Lubin (1849–1919), California. Founder of the California Fruit Growers Union and U.S. delegate to the International Institute of Agriculture.
Cyrus G. Luce (1824–1905), Michigan. 21st Governor of Michigan.
James W. Marshall (1810–1885), Discoverer of California Gold. Charter member of Pilot Hill Grange #1 California
Francis Marion McDowell (1831–1894), Founder of the National Grange. Second Treasurer of the National Grange.
James Nesmith (1820–1885), Oregon. United States Senator from Oregon. 
Krist Novoselic (born 1965), Washington. Bass guitarist for the rock band Nirvana
Gifford Pinchot (1865–1946), Pennsylvania. 28th Governor of Pennsylvania.
Frederick Robie (1822–1912), Maine. 39th Governor of Maine.
Robert P. Robinson (1869–1939), Delaware. 57th Governor of Delaware.
Norman Rockwell (1894–1978), Vermont. American painter.
Eleanor Roosevelt (1884–1962), New York. First Lady of the United States of America.
Franklin D. Roosevelt (1882–1945), New York. 32nd President of the United States of America.
Ellen Alida Rose (1843–?), agriculturist, suffragist.
William Saunders (1822–1900), botanist, landscaper, designer of Soldiers Cemetery in Gettysburg, PA. Founder of the National Grange. First Master/President of the National Grange.
John Strentzel (1813–1890), California. California pioneer, Father-in-law of John Muir.
John R. Thompson (1834–1894), Founder of the National Grange. First Lecturer/Program Director of the National Grange.
John Trimble (1831–1902), Founder of the National Grange. Third Secretary of the National Grange.
Harry S. Truman (1884–1972), Missouri. 33rd President of the United States of America.

See also
 List of Grange Hall buildings
 Order of the Sovereigns of Industry

References

Further reading
 
  
 
 
  – historical account of the organization's first 80 years
 
 
 
 
 
  
 
  – statistical tables showing membership in the Grange and other farm organizations by date and state and region
 
 Other primary sources available on Google Books

External links

 Official Website of the National Grange of the Order of Patrons of Husbandry
 Maryland State Grange of the Patrons of Husbandry records at the University of Maryland Libraries 
  "A Short History of the Order of Patrons of Husbandry, also known as the National Grange," by Charles P. Gilliam
Background, History, Ritual and Emblems of the Grange
Encyclopedia of Arkansas History & Culture
New York State Grange’s official website

 
Economic history of the United States
Agrarian politics
1867 establishments in the United States
Secret societies in the United States
Organizations established in 1867
Non-profit organizations based in Washington, D.C.